The COVID-19 pandemic was confirmed to have reached the Spanish territory of Melilla in March 2020.


Timeline

March 2020
A man who arrived from the Iberian Peninsula carried the virus into the African Spanish Territory in Melilla.

April 2020
By April 16, the city had confirmed a total of 103 cases. 27 had recovered, and two had died.

References

Melilla
21st century in Melilla
2020 in Spain
2021 in Spain
Melilla
Disease outbreaks in Melilla